The demographics of North Korea are determined through national censuses and international estimates. The Central Bureau of Statistics of North Korea conducted the most recent census in 2008, where the population reached 24 million inhabitants. The population density is 199.54 inhabitants per square kilometre, and the 2014 estimated life expectancy is 69.81 years. In 1980, the population rose at a near consistent, but low, rate (0.84% from the two censuses). Since 2000, North Korea's birth rate has exceeded its death rate; the natural growth is positive. In terms of age structure, the population is dominated by the 15–64-year-old segment (68.09%). The median age of the population is 32.9 years, and the gender ratio is 0.95 males to 1.00 female. Since the early 1990s, the birth rate has been fairly stable, with an average of 2 children per woman, down from an average of 3 in the early 1980s.

According to The World Factbook, North Korea is racially homogeneous and contains a small Chinese community and a few ethnic Japanese. The 2008 census listed two nationalities: Korean (%) and Other (%). Korea was annexed by the Empire of Japan in 1910, in which the Korean Peninsula was occupied by Japanese. In 1945, when Japan was defeated in World War II, Korea was divided into two occupied zones: North occupied by the Soviet Union and the South by the United States. Negotiations on unification failed, and in 1948 two separate countries were formed: North and South Korea.

Korean is the official language of North Korea. The World Factbook states "traditionally Buddhist and Confucianist, some Christian and syncretic Chondogyo" in regards to religion, but also states "autonomous religious activities now almost nonexistent; government-sponsored religious groups exist to provide illusion of religious freedom". , 8.86% of the population older than 5 years old have attained academic degrees. In 2000, North Korea spent 38.2% of its expenditures on education, social insurance, and social security. Estimates show that, in 2012, gross domestic product (GDP) per capita was $1,800. The most significant sources of employment were machine building and manufacturing of metallurgical products, military products, and textiles. In 2006, the unemployment rate was between 14.7% and 36.5%. The 2008 census enumerated 5,887,471 households, averaging 3.9 persons per house. Average urbanization rate was 60.3% in 2011.

During the North Korean famine of 1994–1998 somewhere between 240,000 and 3,500,000 North Koreans died from starvation or hunger-related illnesses, with the deaths peaking in 1997. A 2011 U.S. Census Bureau report put the likely number of excess deaths during 1993 to 2000 at from 500,000 to 600,000.

History of reporting demographics

Until the release of official data in 1989, the 1963 edition of the North Korea Central Yearbook was the last official publication to disclose population figures. After 1963 demographers used varying methods to estimate the population. They either totaled the number of delegates elected to the Supreme People's Assembly (each delegate representing 50,000 people before 1962 and 30,000 people afterward) or relied on official statements that a certain number of persons, or percentage of the population, was engaged in a particular activity. Thus, on the basis of remarks made by President Kim Il-sung in 1977 concerning school attendance, the population that year was calculated at 17.2 million persons. During the 1980s, health statistics, including life expectancy and causes of mortality, were gradually made available to the outside world.

In 1989 the Central Bureau of Statistics released demographic data to the United Nations Fund for Population Activities (UNFPA) to secure the UNFPA's assistance in holding North Korea's first nationwide census since the establishment of the DPRK in 1946. Although the figures given to the United Nations (UN) might have been purposely distorted, it appears that in line with other attempts to open itself to the outside world, the North Korean regime has also opened somewhat in the demographic realm. Although the country lacks trained demographers, accurate data on household registration, migration, and births and deaths are available to North Korean authorities.

According to the United States scholar Nicholas Eberstadt and demographer Judith Banister, vital statistics and personal information on residents are kept by agencies on the ri, or ni (: village, the local administrative unit) level in rural areas and the dong (: district or block) level in urban areas.

The next census was scheduled for 2018, but was cancelled.

Size and growth rate
In their 1992 monograph, The Population of North Korea, Eberstadt and Banister use the data given to the UNFPA and make their own assessments. They place the total population at 21.4 million persons in mid-1990, consisting of 10.6 million males and 10.8 million females. This figure is close to an estimate of 21.9 million persons for mid-1988 cited in the 1990 edition of the Demographic Yearbook published by the UN. Korean Review, a book by Pang Hwan-ju published by the Foreign Languages Publishing House in 1987, gives a figure of 19.1 million persons for 1986.

Male-female ratio

The figures disclosed by the government reveal an unusually low proportion of males to females: in 1980 and 1987, the male-to-female ratios were 86.2 to 100, and 84.2 to 100, respectively. Low male-to-female ratios are usually the result of a war, but these figures were lower than the sex ratio of 88.3 males per 100 females recorded for 1953, the last year of the Korean War. The male-to-female ratio would be expected to rise to a normal level with the passage of years, as happened between 1953 and 1970, when the figure was 95.1 males per 100 females. After 1970, however, the ratio declined. Eberstadt and Banister suggest that before 1970 male and female population figures included the whole population, yielding ratios in the ninetieth percentile, but that after that time the male military population was excluded from population figures.

Based on the figures provided by the Central Statistics Bureau, Eberstadt and Banister estimate that the actual size of the "hidden" male North Korean military had reached 1.2 million by 1986 and that the actual male-to-female ratio was 97.1 males to 100 females in 1990. If their estimates are correct, 6.1 percent of North Korea's total population was in the military, numerically the world's fourth largest active military force as of 2021.

A survey in 2017 found that the famine had skewed North Korea's demography, impacting particularly on male infants. Women aged 20–24 made up 4% of the population, while men in the same age group made up only 2.5%.

Growth rate
The annual population growth rate in 1960 was 2.7 percent, rising to a high of 3.6 percent in 1970, and falling to 1.9 percent in 1975. This fall reflected a dramatic decline in the fertility rate: the average number of children born to women decreased from 6.5 in 1966 to 2.5 in 1988. Assuming the data is reliable, reasons for falling growth rates and fertility rates probably include late marriage, urbanization, limited housing space, and the expectation that women would participate equally in work hours in the labor force. The experience of other socialist countries suggests that widespread labor force participation by women often goes hand-in-hand with more traditional role expectations; in other words, they are still responsible for housework and childrearing. The high percentage of males age 17 to 26 may have contributed to the low fertility rate.

According to Eberstadt and Banister's data, the annual population growth rate in 1991 was 1.9 percent. However, the CIA World Factbook estimated that North Korea's annual population growth rate was 1.0% in 1991 and that it has since declined to 0.4% by 2009.

Promoting population growth
The North Korean government seems to perceive its population as too small in relation to that of South Korea. In its public pronouncements, Pyongyang has called for accelerated population growth and encouraged large families. According to one Korean American scholar who visited North Korea in the early 1980s, the country has no birth control policies; parents are encouraged to have as many as six children. The state provides tagaso (nurseries) to lessen the burden of childrearing for parents and offers a 77-day paid leave after childbirth.

Eberstadt and Banister suggest, however, that authorities at the local level make contraceptive information readily available to parents and that intrauterine devices are the most commonly adopted birth control method. An interview with a former North Korean resident in the early 1990s revealed that such devices are distributed free at clinics.

Population structure and projections

Demographers determine the age structure of a given population by dividing it into five-year age-groups and arranging them chronologically in a pyramid-like structure that "bulges" or recedes in relation to the number of persons in a given age cohort. Many poor, developing countries have a broad base and steadily tapering higher levels, which reflects a large number of births and young children but much smaller age cohorts in later years as a result of relatively short life expectancies. North Korea does not entirely fit this pattern; data reveal a "bulge" in the lower ranges of adulthood. In 1991, life expectancy at birth was approximately 66 years for males, almost 73 for females.

It is likely that annual population growth rates will increase, as well as difficulties in employing the many young men and women entering the labor force in a socialist economy already suffering from stagnant growth. Eberstadt and Banister project that the population will stabilize (that is, cease to grow) at 34 million persons in 2045 and will then experience a gradual decline.

Settlement patterns and urbanization

North Korea's population is concentrated in the plains and lowlands. The least populated regions are the mountainous Chagang and Yanggang provinces adjacent to the Chinese border. The largest concentrations of population are in North Pyongan and South Pyongan provinces, in the municipal district of Pyongyang, and in South Hamgyong Province, which includes the Hamhung-Hungnam urban area. Eberstadt and Banister calculate the average population density at 167 persons per square kilometer, ranging from 1,178 persons per square kilometer in Pyongyang Municipality to 44 persons per square kilometer in Yanggang Province. By contrast, South Korea had an average population density of 425 persons per square kilometer in 1989.

Like South Korea, North Korea has experienced significant urban migration since the end of the Korean War. Official statistics reveal that 59.6 percent of the total population was classified as urban in 1987. This figures compares with only 17.7 percent in 1953. It is not entirely clear, however, what standards are used to define urban populations. Eberstadt and Banister suggest that although South Korean statisticians do not classify settlements of under 50,000 as urban, their North Korean counterparts include settlements as small as 20,000 in this category. And, in North Korea, people who engage in agricultural pursuits inside municipalities sometimes are not counted as urban.

Urbanization in North Korea seems to have proceeded most rapidly between 1953 and 1960, when the urban population grew between 12 and 20 percent annually. Subsequently, the increase slowed to about 6 percent annually in the 1960s and between 1 and 3 percent from 1970 to 1987.

In 1987, North Korea's largest cities were Pyongyang, with approximately 2.3 million inhabitants; Hamhung, 701,000; Chongjin, 520,000; Nampo, 370,000; Sunchon, 356,000; and Sinuiju, 289,000. In 1987, the total national population living in Pyongyang was 11.5 percent. The government restricts and monitors migration to cities and ensures a relatively balanced distribution of population in provincial centers in relation to Pyongyang.

Vital statistics
Source: Population Division of the United Nations Department of Economic and Social Affairs

Total and percent distribution of population by single year of age (census 2008)
Source: Central Bureau of Statistics

Koreans living overseas
Large-scale emigration from Korea began around 1904 and continued until the end of World War II. During the Japanese colonial occupation (1910–1945), many Koreans emigrated to: China (particularly Northeast China), the Soviet Union, Hawaii, and the contiguous United States. People from Korea's northern provinces went primarily to Manchuria, China, and Siberia; many of those from the southern provinces went to Japan. Most emigrants left for economic reasons because employment opportunities were scarce; many Korean farmers had lost their land after the Japanese colonial government introduced a system of private land tenure, imposed higher land taxes, and promoted the growth of an absentee landlord class charging exorbitant rents.

In the 1980s, more than 4 million ethnic Koreans lived outside the peninsula. The largest group, about 1.7 million people, lived in China (see Koreans in China); most had assumed Chinese citizenship. Approximately 1 million Koreans, almost exclusively from South Korea, lived in North America (see Korean Americans). About 389,000 ethnic Koreans resided in the former Soviet Union (see Koryosaram and Sakhalin Koreans). One observer noted that Koreans have been so successful in running collective farms in Soviet Central Asia that being Korean is often associated by other citizens with being rich. As a result, there is growing antagonism against Koreans. Smaller groups of Koreans are found in Central America and South America (85,000), the Middle East (62,000), Europe (40,000), Asia (27,000), and Africa (25,000).

Many of Japan's approximately 680,000 Koreans have below average standards of living. This is partly because of discrimination by the Japanese. Many resident Koreans, loyal to North Korea, remain separate from, and often hostile to, the Japanese social mainstream. The pro-North Korean Chongryon (General Association of Korean Residents in Japan) initially was more successful than the pro-South Korean Mindan (Association for Korean Residents in Japan) in attracting adherents. However, the widening disparity between the political and economic conditions of the two Koreas has since made Mindan the larger and certainly the less politically controversial faction. In addition, third- and fourth-generation Zainichi Chosenjin have largely given up active participation or loyalty to the Chongryon ideology. Reasons stated for this increased disassociation include widespread mainstream tolerance of Koreans by Japanese in recent years, greatly reducing the need to rely on Chongryon and the increasing unpopularity of Kim Jong-il even among loyal members of Chongryon.

Between 1959 and 1982, Chongryon encouraged the repatriation of Korean residents in Japan to North Korea. More than 93,000 Koreans left Japan, the majority (80,000 persons) in 1960 and 1961. Thereafter, the number of repatriates declined, apparently because of reports of hardships suffered by their compatriots. Approximately 6,637 Japanese wives accompanied their husbands to North Korea, of whom about 1,828 retained Japanese citizenship in the early 1990s. Pyongyang had originally promised that the wives could return home every two or three years to visit their relatives. In fact, however, they are not allowed to do so, and few have had contact with their families in Japan. In normalization talks between North Korean and Japanese officials in the early 1990s, the latter urged unsuccessfully that the wives be allowed to make home visits. According to a defector, himself a former returnee, many petitioned to be returned to Japan and in response were sent to political prison camps. Japanese research puts the number of Zainichi Korean returnees condemned to prison camps at around 10,000.

CIA World Factbook demographic statistics

The following demographic statistics are from the CIA World Factbook, unless otherwise indicated:

Population: 25,115,311 (July 2016 est.)

Age structure
0–14 years:
20.97% (male 2,678,638/female 2,588,744)
15–24 years:
15.88% (male 2,009,360/female 1,977,942)
25–54 years:
44.22% (male 5,567,682/female 5,537,077)
55–64 years:
9.19% (male 1,090,739/female 1,218,406)
65 years and over:
9.74% (male 840,003/female 1,606,720) (2016 est.)

Population growth rate
1.02% (1991 est.)
0.31% (1996 est.)
0.87% (2006 est.)
0.42% (2009 est.)
0.53% (2016 est.)

Birth rate
20.01 births/1,000 population (1991 est.)
17.58 births/1,000 population (1996 est.)
14.61 births/1,000 population (2006 est.)
14.61 births/1,000 population (2008 est.)
14.60 births/1,000 population (2016 est.)

Death rate
8.94 deaths/1,000 population (1991 est.)
9.52 deaths/1,000 population (1996 est.)
7.29 deaths/1,000 population (2006 est.)
7.29 deaths/1,000 population (2008 est.)
9.30 deaths/1,000 population (2016 est.)

Net migration rate:
0 migrant(s)/1,000 population (2016 est.)

Sex ratio
at birth:
1.05 male(s)/female
0–14 years:
1.03 male(s)/female
15–24 years:
1.02 male(s)/female
25–54 years:
1.01 male(s)/female
55–64 years:
0.9 male(s)/female
65 years and over:
0.53 male(s)/female
total population:
0.94 male(s)/female (2016 est.)

Infant mortality rate
total: 22.9 deaths/1,000 live births (2016 est.)

Life expectancy at birth
total population:
70.4 years
male:
66.6 years
female:
74.5 years (2016 est.)

Total fertility rate
2.09 children born/woman (2006 est.)
1.94 children born/woman (2010 est.)
1.96 children born/woman (2016 est.)
1.91 children born/woman (2021 est.)

Nationality
noun: Korean(s)
adjective: Korean

Ethnic groups
racially homogeneous: Koreans; small Chinese community, a few ethnic Russians, Japanese, Singaporeans, ethnic Thai, ethnic Indian, ethnic African, Americans and ethnic Vietnamese

Religion:
no statistics available; predominantly Buddhism, Shamanism, Confucianism, and Cheondoism (see "religion in North Korea")

Language: Korean

Literacy
definition:
age 15 and over can read and write Korean using the Korean script Hangul
total population: 100%
male: 100%
female: 100% (2015 est.)

See also

 1993 North Korea Census
 2008 North Korea Census
 Ethnic minorities in North Korea
 Demographics of South Korea

Citations

General and cited references 
 

 
 
 
 

 
Society of North Korea

pt:Coreia do Norte#Demografia